This is a list of Swedish military commanders. Several Swedish monarchs also acted directly as military commanders.



17th century 
Jacob de la Gardie (1583-1652), Field Marshal
Gustav Horn (1592-1657), Field Marshal
Johan Banér (1596-1641), Field Marshal
Per Brahe (1602-1680)
Lennart Torstenson (1603-1651), Field Marshal
Nils Brahe (1604-1632)
Lorens von der Linde (1610-1670), Field Marshal
Carl Gustaf Wrangel (1613-1676), Field Marshal

18th century 
Jacob Magnus Sprengtporten (1727-1786)
Göran Magnus Sprengtporten (1740-1819)
Johan Christopher Toll (1743-1817), Field Marshal
Axel von Fersen, senior (1755-1810)
Gustaf Mauritz Armfelt (1757-1814)

19th century 
Carl Johan Adlercreutz (1757-1815)
Georg Carl von Döbeln (1758-1820)
Johan August Sandels (1764-1831)
Nils Magnus Brahe (1790-1844)

Monarchs as military commanders 

Gustavus Adolphus of Sweden
Charles X Gustav of Sweden
Charles XI of Sweden (1655-1697)
Charles XII of Sweden (1682-1718)
Gusatv III
Charles XIII
Charles XIV John of Sweden (1763-1844)

See also
List of Swedish field marshals
List of wars involving Sweden
Supreme Commander of the Swedish Armed Forces

 Swedish military commanders